Alexander Laner (born 1974 Munich) is a German artist.

In 1991–1993, he trained as a painter and creator of neon advertising.
In 1993–1996, he trained as stonemason.
In 1997–2004, he studied at the Academy of Fine Arts, Munich with Olaf Metzel.
He lives and works in Munich.

Awards
2004 Lothar Späth Prize of the Stiftung Kunstakademie Munich
2005 Villa Romana prize
2005 Förderpreis of the City of Munich
2011 Bayerischer Kunstförderpreis
2017 Arbeitsstipendium des Kunstfonds

Exhibitions
2009
Sassa Trulzsch, Berlin
2008
07.12.08–22.03.09 Heavy Metal. Die unerklärbare Leichtigkeit eines Materials Kunsthalle Kiel
26.09.08–25.10.08 ready made today Galerie Steinle, München
23.02.08–20.04.08 Merkwürdige Maschinen Kunstverein Wolfsburg
2007
24.05.07–26.08.07 Made in Germany Kestner Gesellschaft, Hannover
12.01.07–10.02.07 HÜBEN WIE DRÜBEN Galleri Tom Christoffersen, Kopenhagen
2006
09.09.06–13.10.06 Debutanten Galerie der Künstler, München
22.07.06–03.09.06 Hermann-Götz-Preis 2006 Künstlerhaus Marktoberdorf
02.06.06–30.06.06 Robert Klümpen / Alexander Laner Galerie Peter Tedden, Düsseldorf
04.05.06–21.07.06 Serve and Volley Häusler Contemporary München
07.02.06–11.03.06 YBA – Young Bavarian Art Gagosian Gallery Berlin
2005
"SayNoProduction. part II“, Galerie Klüser 2, Munich
 Rote Zelle, Munich
"Neue Heimat“, Rathausgalerie, Munich
"Förderpreise“, Lothringerhalle 13, Munich

2004
"Love it or Leave it“, Cetinski Biennale, Monte Negro
"Villa Romana-Preisträger“, Von der Heydt Museum Wuppertal
"Klotzen und Kleckern“, Mixküche, Munich
Debütantenausstellung Akademie der Bildenden Künste, Munich

2003
"Viva Las Vegas“, Ponybar, Berlin
Jahresgaben Kunstverein Munich

2002
"Oltre il giardino“, Rimini

2001
"Helga und Goldankauf“, Kunstraum Munich

2000
"Left a good job in the city“, CARE OF, Milano
Jahresausstellung Haus der Kunst, Munich

1999
"Schöpfung“, Diözesanmuseum Freising
"Gâre au Voyage“, Fribourg/Switzerland

References

External links
"Alexander Laner", artnet

Artists from Munich
1974 births
Living people
Academy of Fine Arts, Munich alumni